Muhammad Shahid Nazir (Urdu, ; born 1981), also known as the One Pound Fish Man (sometimes stylised as £1 Fish Man), is a Pakistani trader and singer-songwriter who found Internet fame with his viral video, "One Pound Fish". His subsequent appearance on The X Factor led to a record deal with Warner Music.

Personal life 
Nazir was born in the town of Pattoki, near Lahore in Punjab, Pakistan. He grew up listening to Bollywood and Punjabi music, and would sing religious songs during assembly at school. Prior to emigrating to the United Kingdom for a better life, Nazir worked for the family-owned transport company. He is married to Kashifa. The couple has four children. His mother, wife and children are still living in Pattoki.

Career

"One Pound Fish" 
Following brief employment at a pound shop, Nazir, who had since settled in East London, began work at a fish stall at Queen's Market, Upton Park, where his employer instructed him to use a trader's call to attract customers. He soon composed the song "One Pound Fish":

After passing customers uploaded videos of him performing his song onto YouTube, it became an internet smash and a viral video, and he was invited to perform the song on the television show The X Factor. The song was later covered by Alesha Dixon, Timbaland and Mindless Behavior.

Post X Factor 
In November 2012, Nazir was signed by Warner Music as a recording artist, and released a dance version of his market sales pitch. A video was also filmed which featured Bollywood-style dancers and an appearance from former weatherman Michael Fish. The song was in the running for securing the Christmas Number One for 2012 alongside X Factor winner James Arthur's release of his winning song "Impossible".

Return to Pakistan
Nazir's fame alerted the UK's immigration services. Nazir had arrived in the United Kingdom on a student visa, but left his studies to work as a fishmonger. In December 2012, under the government policy he was ordered to leave the country as his visa had expired. He returned to Pakistan in December 2012. His management said he would return to the UK to promote his musical career with a new entry visa. His agent, Samir Ahmed, said: "He will be returning to Pakistan and will be celebrating New Year with his family. His return to the UK is pending approval of a working visa. We fully expect him to return in the coming weeks".
According to a 2016 article in the New Statesman, Nazir was declined a new visa to enter the UK because he violated the terms of his last visa by singing as a professional entertainer. A year after that he applied for another visa to try and appear in a film about his life, however it was also denied.

Discography

Singles

References

1981 births
21st-century Pakistani male singers
Pakistani male singer-songwriters
Living people
Musicians from Punjab, Pakistan
People from Kasur District
Punjabi people
Pakistani businesspeople
Warner Music Group artists
Internet memes
English-language singers from Pakistan
Fishmongers (people)